Kaptin is a protein that in humans is encoded by the KPTN gene.

Model organisms 

Model organisms have been used in the study of KPTN function. A conditional knockout mouse line, called Kptntm1a(EUCOMM)Wtsi was generated as part of the International Knockout Mouse Consortium program — a high-throughput mutagenesis project to generate and distribute animal models of disease to interested scientists.

Male and female animals underwent a standardized phenotypic screen to determine the effects of deletion. Twenty two tests were carried out on mutant mice and six significant abnormalities were observed. Homozygous mutant mice had hyperalbuminemia, decreased mature B cell numbers and  increased susceptibility to bacterial infection. Female mice also had increased body weight, body fat and impaired glucose tolerance.

Clinical

Mutations in this gene have been associated with a syndrome of acrocephaly, muscular hypotonia, global development delay, dyspraxia and hand-mouth synkinesia.

References

Further reading 

 
 
 
 
 
 
 

Genes mutated in mice